José Jefferson Carpinteiro Peres (18 March 1932 – 23 May 2008), commonly known as Jefferson Peres, was a Brazilian professor and politician and a member of the Brazilian Senate (Senado Federal).

Career
In the 2006 presidential election, Peres was the vice-presidential candidate for the Democratic Labour Party (PDT), supporting Cristovam Buarque's presidential candidacy.

Péres was involved in a popular movement to nationalize the oil industry in Brazil in the 1950s.

He opposed the reconstruction of the BR-319 highway through Brazil's rain forest. He called for the replacement of the "wholly artificial" Manaus industrial park (which exists in part because of tax incentives) with production of goods from local raw materials.

In 1988 he became the mayor of Manaus and held that position until he was elected to the Senate in 1995.

Outside politics Peres was the director of Universidade Federal do Amazonas and Fundação Getulio Vargas. He taught economics at Universidade Federal do Amazonas.

References

External links
Official site at Brazil's Senate 

1932 births
2008 deaths
Academic staff of the Federal University of Amazonas
Brazilian economists
Academic staff of Fundação Getulio Vargas
Democratic Labour Party (Brazil) politicians
Members of the Federal Senate (Brazil)

Candidates for Vice President of Brazil